Undichna is a fish-fin, or fish-swimming fossil trail left as a fossil impression on a substrate, or the opposite impression on an overlying substrate; this type of fossil is an ichnofossil, in this case a specific ichnogenus, Undichna; the term "undichna" is composed of the words: 'und'–'ichna', for "wave-trace".

At present, the oldest known Undichna were made by cephalaspids, that only had presumptive motion scenarios, due to the physiological form of the cephalaspids as predating the teleosts, (bony fishes). The trails are from the border of England and Wales, from 400 mya, in an ancient riverbed environment.

See also
Lateral undulation, a type of undulation for fish, sea animals, and snakes
Trace fossil
Fossil trackway

External links
Undichna and the England Cephalaspid trackways

Fish trace fossils
Fossil trackways
Prehistoric fish